Sy-David Friedman (born May 23, 1953, in Chicago) is an American and Austrian mathematician and a (retired) professor of mathematics at the University of Vienna and the former director of the Kurt Gödel Research Center for Mathematical Logic. His main research interest lies in mathematical logic, in particular in set theory and recursion theory.

Friedman is the brother of Ilene Friedman and the brother of mathematician Harvey Friedman.

Biography 
He studied at Northwestern University and, from 1970, at the Massachusetts Institute of Technology. He received his Ph.D. in 1976 from MIT (his thesis Recursion on Inadmissible Ordinals was written under the supervision of Gerald E. Sacks).

In 1979, Sy Friedman accepted a position at MIT, and in 1990 he became a full professor there.  Since 1999, he has been a professor of mathematical logic at the University of Vienna (since 2018 retired). He is a Fellow of Collegium Invisibile.

Selected publications and results
He has authored about 70 research articles, including: 

He also published a research monograph

References

External links 
 

20th-century American mathematicians
21st-century American mathematicians
Austrian mathematicians
American emigrants to Austria
Set theorists
Fellows of Collegium Invisibile
1953 births
Living people